Plummet may refer to:

 Plumb bob, a weight with a pointed tip on the bottom that is suspended from a string and used as a reference line that is perpendicular to the ground
Sinker (fishing)
 Plummet (musicians), a trance duo
 Plummet (novel), by Sherwin Tjia (2020)

See also
 Plumb (disambiguation)